Events in the year 1923 in Bulgaria.

Incumbents

Events 

 22 April – The Bulgarian Agrarian National Union won 212 of the 245 seats in the parliament following parliamentary elections. Voter turnout was 86.5%.

References 

 
1920s in Bulgaria
Years of the 20th century in Bulgaria
Bulgaria
Bulgaria